Jura regalia is a medieval legal term which denoted rights that belonged exclusively to the king, either as essential to his sovereignty (jura majora, jura essentialia), such as royal authority; or accidental (jura minora, jura accidentalia), such as hunting, fishing and mining rights. Many sovereigns in the Middle Ages and in later times claimed the right to seize the revenues of vacant episcopal sees or abbeys, claiming a regalian right. In some countries, especially in France where it was known as droit de régale ,  jura regalia came to be applied almost exclusively to that assumed right. A liberty was an area in which the regalian right did not apply.

Rationale 
It is a matter of dispute on what ground the temporal rulers claimed the revenues of vacant dioceses and abbeys. Some hold that it is an inherent right of sovereignty; others state that it is a necessary consequence of the right of investiture; others make it part of the feudal system; still others derive it from the advowson, or right which patrons or protectors had over their benefices. Ultimately, it had its origin in the assumption that bishoprics and imperial abbeys, with all their temporalities and privileges, were royal estates given as fiefs to the bishops or abbots, and subject to the feudal laws of the times. At first the right was exercised only during the actual vacancy of a see or abbey, but it was later extended over the whole year following the death of the bishop or abbot. Often, the temporal rulers also claimed the right to collate all the benefices that became vacant during the vacancy of a diocese, with the exception of those to which the cure of souls was attached.

History 
It is difficult to determine when and where the jura regalia was first exercised. In the West Frankish Kingdom it made its first appearance probably towards the end of the Carolingian dynasty, that is, in the course of the tenth century.

England 
In England, the exact practice prior to the Norman Conquest of England in 1066 is unclear, but for monasteries it is likely that the bishop or the prior administered the estate, and that the revenues did not go to the king. Under King William the Conqueror, the record is also unclear, but the absence of monastic complaints suggests that revenues did not go to the royal treasury.

The first historical mention we find of it is in connection with King William II of England, who, after the death of Lanfranc in 1089, kept the Diocese of Canterbury vacant for more than three years, during which period the king seized all the archiepiscopal revenues. William II was also known for keeping other bishoprics and abbeys vacant so that his own officials could administer them and keep the income for the king, although recent studies have shown that this was not quite as common as indicated by the complaints of medieval chroniclers. The income from the regalian right was an important, if irregular, source of income for the kings. At least in England under William II, there was a natural tendency to keep the more lucrative offices vacant longer than the poorer offices, thus allowing the royal revenue to be augmented.

Although William's successor, King Henry I at the start of his reign said he would abandon the practice of leaving ecclesiastical offices vacant in order to secure their revenue for himself, events soon required him to exploit the regalian rights also. Henry's most recent biographer, C. Warren Hollister, argued that Henry never intended to renounce the exercise of the regalian right, merely the abuses of it that William II was accused of by the monastic chroniclers. The Pipe roll from 1130 shows a number of vacant benefices whose revenues were going to the royal coffers.

During the reign of Henry II of England (1154–89) it had become an established practice for the King of England to take possession of the revenues of all vacant dioceses, although the king generally allowed a division of revenues between the actual monks and the abbatial office, and did not administer or touch the monks' income. Revenues from the regalian rights were normally paid into the Exchequer, who would record it on the pipe rolls. That the pope did not recognize the right is manifest from the fact that Pope Alexander III condemned article 12 of the Council of Clarendon (1164), which provided that the king was to receive, as of seigniorial right (sicut dominicos), all the income (omnes reditus et exitus) of a vacant archbishopric, bishopric, abbacy, or priory in his dominion. In 1176 Henry II promised the papal legate never to exercise the right of regalia beyond one year. With the exception of a few short periods, the right continued to be exercised by the English kings until the Protestant Reformation. Even at present the British Crown exercises it over the temporalities of vacant (Anglican) dioceses.

Germany 
In Germany Emperor Henry V (1106–25), Emperor Conrad III (1138–52), and Emperor Frederick I (1155–89) are known as the first to have claimed it. Frederick I exercised it in its utmost rigour and styles it "an ancient right of kings and emperors". King Philip of Germany reluctantly renounced it, together with the jus spolii to Pope Innocent III in 1203. Emperor Otto IV did the same in 1209. Emperor Frederick II renounced it to Innocent III, first at Eger, on 12 July 1213, then in the Privilege of Würzburg, in May, 1216, and again to Pope Honorius III, at Hagenau, in September, 1219. In 1238 he began to exercise it anew, but only during the actual vacancy of dioceses, not for a whole year, as he had done previously. After the death of Frederick II the claims of the German Emperors to this right gradually ceased. The revenues of vacant dioceses in Prussia went to the succeeding bishop; in Bavaria, to the cathedral church; in Austria, to the "Religionsfond".

Important regalia were the:
 Right to allocate episcopal offices and to call synods,
 Ability to dispose of duchies, counties, margraviates and unclaimed territories,
 Duty to ensure internal peace (law and order),
 Ability to grant of protection to people who were not under the protection of the clan,
 Right to exercise the highest level of jurisdiction,
 Right to build royal palaces (Pfalzen),
 Right to nominate consuls,
 Sovereignty over transportation routes,
 Right to charge tolls (Zollregal),
 Right of coinage (Münzregal),
 Mining rights (Bergregal),
 Market rights (Marktregal),
 Salt rights (Salzregal),
 Fodrum (services for the maintenance of the imperial courts),
 Treasure rights (Schatzregal) (the rights to treasure trove),
 Fortification rights Befestigungsrecht,
 Right of escort (Geleitrecht),
 Jewish right of protection Judenregal (Judenschutzrecht),
 Water rights (Wasserregal),
 Hunting and fishing rights (Jagd- und Fischereiregal) or forest rights (Forstregal),
 Right to uninherited property, including the right of spoil (Jus Spolii or Spolienrecht)
 Amber rights (Bernsteinregal).

France 
In France the first mention of it is found during the reign of Louis VII, when, in 1143, Bernard of Clairvaux complains, in a letter to the Bishop of Palestrina, that in the Church of Paris the king had extended the droit de régale over a whole year. Pope Boniface VIII, in his bull Ausculta fili, of 5 December 1301, urged Philip the Fair to renounce it, but without avail. In France, the right did not belong exclusively to the king: it was also exercised by the Dukes of Normandy, Dukes of Brittany, Dukes of Burgundy, Counts of Champagne and the Counts of Anjou. Entirely exempt from it were the ecclesiastical province of Bordeaux, province of Auch, province of Narbonne, province of Arles, province of Aix, province of Embrun, and province of Vienne.

The Second Council of Lyons (1274) forbade anyone, under pain of excommunication, to extend the jus regaliae over any diocese that was then exempt from it, and in 1499 Louis XII gave strict orders to his officials not to exercise it over exempt dioceses. Towards the end of the sixteenth century the restriction of the Council of Lyons began to be disregarded, and on 24 April 1608, the Parliament decided that the king had the droit de régale over all the dioceses of France; but Henry IV of France did not carry this parliamentary decision into effect.

On 10 February 1673, Louis XIV issued a declaration extending the droit de régale to all of France. The Parliament was pleased, and most bishops yielded without serious protest, with only Nicolas Pavillon, of Alet, and François de Caulet, bishop of Pamiers, both Jansenists resisting. They at first sought redress through their metropolitans, but when the latter took the king's side, they appealed in 1677 to Pope Innocent XI. In three successive Briefs, Innocent  urged the king not to extend the right to dioceses that had previously been exempt. The General Assembly of the French clergy, held at Paris in 1681-1682, sided with the king, and, despite the protests of Innocent XI, Alexander VIII, and Innocent XII, the right was maintained until the French Revolution.

Napoleon I attempted to restore it in a decree dated 6 November 1813, but his downfall the following year frustrated his plan. In 1880, the Third Republic again asserted the right and overstepped even the limits of its former application.

See also 
 Royal prerogative
 Regalia

Sources 
 
 
Du Cange, Glossarium, s. v. Regalia
 
Pierre de Marca, De concordia sacerdotii et imperii, lib. VIII (1704)
Felix Makower, Die Verfassung der Kirche von England (Berlin, 1894), 326 sq.
 
George Jakob Phillips, Das Regalienrecht in Frankreich (Halle, 1873)
Léon Mention, Documents relatifs aux rapports du clergé avec la royauté de 1682 à 1702, I (Paris, 1893) 18 sq.
E. Michelet, Du droit de régale (thesis) (Ligugé, 1900)
 
 
Ulrich Stutz, in Realencyclopädie für protestantische Theologie und Kirche, XVI (Leipzig, 1905), 536-44
Louis Thomassin, Vetus ac nova ecclesiae disciplina circa beneficia, III, lib. II, liv

References

External links 
Catholic Encyclopedia article
Ulrich Stutz article (with bibliography)

French legal terminology
Medieval law